Henry Leung from the University of Calgary, Alberta, Canada was named Fellow of the Institute of Electrical and Electronics Engineers (IEEE) in 2015 for contributions to chaotic communications and nonlinear signal processing.

References

Fellow Members of the IEEE
Living people
Place of birth missing (living people)
American electrical engineers
Year of birth missing (living people)
Academic staff of the University of Calgary